Kamraj can refer to:
An alternative spelling of K. Kamaraj, a Chief Minister of Tamil Nadu (then Madras state).
A colloquial term for Helminthostachys zeylanica, a plant